Adéfọpẹ́ is a Yoruba surname meaning "the crown or royalty grants thanksgivings". Notable people with the surname include:

Henry Adefope (1926–2012), Nigerian politician
Lolly Adefope (born 1990), English stand-up comedian and actress

Surnames of Nigerian origin